George Benjamin Meehan Jr. (1891–1947) was the cinematographer of more than 150 American films.

Life
Meehan was born on July 19, 1891, in Brooklyn, New York. During World War I he was a cinematographer in the United States Army. He married Louise Harriett Mahoney.

Meehan was the cinematographer for Mary of the Movies (1923), Ben Hur: A Tale of the Christ (1925), The Ghost Talks (1929), Back to the Woods (1937), The Big Chance (1933), Inside Information (1934), Tarzan’s Revenge (1938), Riders of Black River (1939), The Wildcat of Tucson (1940), Beyond the Sacramento (1940), and Voice of the Whistler (1945).<ref>[https://books.google.com/books?id=PKxN1as8XOMC&pg=PA271 Columbia Pictures Horror, Science Fiction and Fantasy Films, 1928–1982]</ref>

Death
Meehan was working on King of the Wild Horses when he became ill and was replaced on the project by Philip Tannura. Meehan died on February 10, 1947, in Hollywood, California, and was buried in the Forest Lawn Memorial Park of Glendale, California.

Selected filmography
 Battling Buddy (1924)
 The Great Sensation (1925)
 The New Champion (1925)
 Fighting Youth (1925)
 Ship of Wanted Men (1933)
 Code of the Range (1936)
 Two Gun Law (1937)
 The Taming of the West (1939)
 The Return of Wild Bill (1940)
 Bullets for Bandits (1942)
 Terror Trail'' (1946)

References

1891 births
1947 deaths
American cinematographers
People from Brooklyn